Crime at Guildford is a 1935 detective novel by the writer Freeman Wills Crofts. Crofts was a leading figure of the Golden Age of Detective Fiction and often set his novels in Surrey where he lived close to Guildford. It was the thirteenth in a series of novels featuring Inspector French. It was published in America by Dodd Mead under the alternative title The Crime at Nornes.

Synopsis
The accountant of a large but struggling firm of jewellers is murdered while attending a meeting at the managing director's house near Guildford, while at the same time a large robbery takes place at the firm's offices on Kingsway.

References

Bibliography
 Evans, Curtis. Masters of the "Humdrum" Mystery: Cecil John Charles Street, Freeman Wills Crofts, Alfred Walter Stewart and the British Detective Novel, 1920-1961. McFarland, 2014.
 Reilly, John M. Twentieth Century Crime & Mystery Writers. Springer, 2015.

1935 British novels
Novels by Freeman Wills Crofts
British crime novels
British mystery novels
British thriller novels
Novels set in Surrey
Novels set in London
British detective novels
Collins Crime Club books
Guildford